Yannan may refer to:

Yannan Subdistrict, Lanzhou, Gansu, China
Yannan Subdistrict, Yong'an, Fujian, China
Yannan station of Shenzhen Metro, in Shenzhen, Guangdong, China